Valke may refer to:

 Michel Valke (1959–), a Dutch footballer.
 Falcons (rugby team), a South African rugby union team better known by their Afrikaans name, the Valke.